Thriler (Greek: Θρίλερ; English: Thriller) is the 17th studio album by Greek singer-songwriter and record producer Nikos Karvelas, released by Legend Recordings in 2006. It reached number 10 on the Greek Albums Chart.

Track listing

External links 
 Official site

2006 albums
Albums produced by Nikos Karvelas
Greek-language albums
Nikos Karvelas albums